Ribafrecha is a municipality of the autonomous community of La Rioja (Spain).  It is located near the capital, Logroño.  Its population in January 2006 was 1,008 inhabitants over a 34.58 square kilometre area.

References

Municipalities in La Rioja (Spain)